Suzhou Dongwu Football Club is a professional Chinese football club that currently participates in the China League One division under licence from the Chinese Football Association (CFA). The team is based in Suzhou, Jiangsu and their home stadium is the 45,000 seat Suzhou Olympic Sports Center Stadium.

History
The club was established on 29 May 2008 as an amateur club named Suzhou Jinfu F.C. (Simplified Chinese: 苏州锦富). They are among the most successful amateur football clubs in the country, which have won China Amateur Football League in 2012 and, after changing their name to Suzhou Dongwu, again in 2015–––the latter of which would earn them promotion to 2016 China League Two. At the beginning of the 2018 league season the club would change the team's crest and colours from yellow to red with black stripes.

In the 2019 China League Two season the club finished fourth and despite this not being enough to gain promotion, China League One side Sichuan Longfor disbanded due to financial problems and Suzhou were promoted to the 2020 China League One.

Name history
2008–2014 Suzhou Jinfu F.C. 苏州锦富
2015– Suzhou Dongwu F.C. 苏州东吴

Players

Current squad

Coaching staff

Managerial history
  Tang Bo (2012–2016)
  Kazuo Uchida (2017–2018)
  Liu Junwei (2019–2020)
  Gary White (2020–Present)

Results
All-time league rankings

As of the end of 2018 season.

Key
 Pld = Played
 W = Games won
 D = Games drawn
 L = Games lost
 F = Goals for
 A = Goals against
 Pts = Points
 Pos = Final position

 DNQ = Did not qualify
 DNE = Did not enter
 NH = Not Held
 – = Does Not Exist
 R1 = Round 1
 R2 = Round 2
 R3 = Round 3
 R4 = Round 4

 F = Final
 SF = Semi-finals
 QF = Quarter-finals
 R16 = Round of 16
 Group = Group stage
 GS2 = Second Group stage
 QR1 = First Qualifying Round
 QR2 = Second Qualifying Round
 QR3 = Third Qualifying Round

References

Football clubs in China